Fawell is a surname. Notable people with the surname include:

Beverly Fawell (1930–2013), American politician, sister-in-law of Harris
Harris W. Fawell (1929–2021), American politician
Scott Fawell, American politician
William Fawell, Archdeacon of Totnes

See also
Falwell